The kleiner Panzerbefehlswagen, known also by its ordnance inventory designation Sd.Kfz. 265, was the German Army's first purpose-designed armoured command vehicle; a type of armoured fighting vehicle designed to provide a tank unit commander with mobility and communications on the battlefield.  A development of the Army's first mass-produced tank, the Panzer I Ausf. A, the Sd.Kfz. 265 saw considerable action during the early years of the war, serving in Panzer units through 1942 and with other formations until late in the war.

The kleiner Panzerbefehlswagen, is commonly referred to as a command tank, but as it is without a turret or offensive armament and merely is built on the chassis of the Panzer I light tank, it does not retain the capabilities or role of a tank.  Instead, it functions more along the line of an armoured personnel carrier in conveying the unit commander and his radio operator under armour about the battlefield.

History
The Sd.Kfz. 265 was designed to fulfill a growing need within the German Army for a command tank, following the realization that the leaders of a massive panzer formation would themselves have to travel in a tank of some type. This vehicle would have to carry extra equipment and personnel to assist the field commander in his duties.  The Panzer I Ausf A then in service lacked a transmitter, and thus was unsuitable for commanders as they would have to leave the tank and rely on more vulnerable vehicles to carry a transmitter in order to be able to issue orders to their formation.

Wishing to retain the Panzer I's armour and mobility, it was decided to modify the Panzer I Ausf. A to do the job. Not entirely satisfactory, significant chassis redesign was required, though this ultimately provided the basis for improvements in the combat tank line as well.

Design
To increase space for a unit commander, radio operator, and a FuG 6 radio transmitter with associated gear the rotating turret and main armament of the Panzer I combat tank was removed.  A tall, fixed superstructure was installed which contained space for the commander and radio operator to work, and a single ball-mounted machine gun was mounted in the front armour of this to give the tank a measure of defensive firepower.  Fittings in the vehicle provided for carriage of 900 rounds of ammunition for the machine gun, which was either an MG 34 or older MG 18 in some examples, though in the field it was common for the gun and ammunition storage to be removed to allow for additional internal space.  While room existed within this structure for map boards, paperwork and other kit required for operational command and radio operation, the vehicle's interior remained small, a factor leading to its rapid replacement by conversions of larger tanks.

Six such conversions were made but meanwhile a new chassis was developed with offered more space for the modifications, and all production vehicles were made on this larger base.  In addition to more space, the original tank's 60 hp 4-cylinder air-cooled Krupp M305 engine was replaced by a 100 hp 6-cylinder liquid-cooled Maybach NL38TR to power not only the vehicle, but the newly installed equipment.  The new chassis was more satisfactory and would go on to form the basis for the second mass-produced Panzer I, the Ausf. B.

Production and operational history
In addition to the six Panzer I Ausf A-based prototypes, 184 production examples were built by Daimler-Benz from 1935 through 1937, meaning the German Army received just over one kleine Panzerbefehlswagen for every ten Panzer I Ausf. A and B combat tanks built.  Between 1935 and 1940 the Sd.Kfz. 265 Panzerbefehlswagen was the standard command tank of the German Panzer divisions. Each Panzer division contained sixteen tank companies, grouped into four battalions, two regiments or one brigade, for a total of twenty-three headquarters. Each headquarters would be issued at least one command tank. In 1940 the Sd.Kfz. 265 was also issued to the signals and observation battalions of the Panzer artillery regiments.

The Sd.Kfz. 265 first saw combat in the Polish Campaign of September 1939. Afterwards, many were converted to Sanitätskraftwagen I (Sd.Kfz. 265) armoured ambulances which served in the French Campaign of 1940. Of the 190 produced, 96 were still in use in May 1940 at the start of the invasion of France and the Low Countries. Following a 15 mm increase in armour protection (to a total of 28 mm) that was hastily applied to the surfaces of the superstructure as a result of combat experiences in Poland, the Sd.Kfz. 265 command tank continued in use throughout the invasions of France and the Netherlands, and in 1941 many were shipped across the Mediterranean to participate in the North African Campaign. Sd.Kfz. 265 also saw considerable action in the Balkans Campaigns of 1941 before being replaced by larger command vehicles. Though replaced at the company level, many would continue to see service at higher levels of command through 1942. Some were also used as radio control vehicles for Minenräum-Wagen BI/BII (Sd.Kfz.300). A small number were also exported to Hungary. A few were still in service with the German Army when the war ended, though largely delegated to training roles.

Survivors

Sd.Kfz. 265 Panzerbefehlswagen I Ausf B in markings of 1st Battalion of the 21st Panzer Division (as captured in North Africa) is on display at the Bovington Tank Museum, UK.

References 

 
 
 

Light tanks of the interwar period
Light tanks of Germany
World War II tanks of Germany
Tanks of the interwar period
Military vehicles introduced in the 1930s